The Carpathian wisent (Bison bonasus hungarorum) was a subspecies of the European bison that inhabited the Carpathian Mountains, Moldavia and Transylvania. It may also have lived in what are today Ukraine and Hungary.

It began to die out about a hundred years earlier than its very close cousin, the Caucasian wisent, probably because it lived nearer to the more densely populated Central Europe. Humans encroached on its habitat and overhunted the bison. The last Carpathian wisent was shot in Máramaros in 1852. The subspecies is now entirely extinct.

Wisents descended from the Polish population were reintroduced into the southern Carpathians by Rewilding Europe and the World Wide Fund for Nature starting in 2014. The rewilding area hosted a population of 30 animals by the end of 2017.

Description
The Carpathian wisent resembled the European bison in that coat was dense and dark brown to golden brown. The neck was short, maned, and thick, topped by a shoulder hump. The head is relatively high. The horns, found in both sexes, projected outwards and curved upwards and slightly forwards.

See also
List of extinct animals of Europe

References

External links
The Extinction Website - Carpathian European Bison - Bison bonasus hungarorum.
European bison / Wisent

Bison
Extinct mammals of Europe
Species made extinct by human activities
Mammal extinctions since 1500